Issyk-Kul International Airport (Kyrgyz: Ысык-Көл эл аралык аэропорту, Isıq-Köl el aralıq aeroportu, ىسىق-كۅل ەل ارالىق اەروپورتۇ; Russian: Международный аэропорт «Иссык-Куль», Meždunarodnyj aeroport «Issyk-Kulj»)  is an international airport near Tamchy, a village in Issyk Kul District of Issyk Kul Region (oblast) of Kyrgyzstan. The Russian IATA code for Issyk-Kul International Airport is ИКУ.

Formerly known as Tamchy Airport, Issyk-Kul International Airport started its operations in 1975 as a reserve airport for the nearby Cholpon-Ata Airport. The current runway and terminal were built in 2003. In the same year, the Kyrgyz Government renamed Tamchy Airport to Issyk-Kul International Airport. It is a class 3C airport, has no instrument landing facilities and operates only during daylight hours.

Issyk-Kul International Airport has customs and border control checks and serves both domestic and international flights. There are plans to extend the runway by a further 500 m.

Airlines and destinations

References

External links 
 Official website
 Issyk-Kul International Airport on OurAirports.com

Airports in Kyrgyzstan
Airports built in the Soviet Union